Modanella is a village in Tuscany, central Italy, administratively a frazione of the comune of Rapolano Terme, province of Siena.

Modanella is about 33 km from Siena and 7 km from Rapolano Terme.

Bibliography 
 
 

Frazioni of Rapolano Terme